The Port Sudan Refinery is an oil refinery located in the city of Port Sudan, Sudan, on the shores of the Red Sea.
The refinery has been de-commissioned and is no longer in service, as it cannot process Sudanese crude oil.

References

Oil and gas companies of Sudan
Oil refineries in Sudan
Port Sudan
1964 establishments in Sudan